Julius Hare may refer to:

 Julius Hare (artist) (1859–1932), British artist
 Julius Hare (theologian)  (1795–1855), English theologian